The Sand River or Polokwane River is a watercourse in Limpopo Province, South Africa, a right hand tributary of the Limpopo River. Its new name "Polokwane River" is homonymous with the name of the town of Polokwane, formerly Pietersburg, about  upriver from its mouth. The Sand River flows by the western edge of this town.

Course
It has its source south of Mokopane and flows northwards across central Limpopo Province until it cuts across the Soutpansberg through a deep gorge, the Waterpoort. Although considered a perennial stream it is often dry in the winter.

The veld in the Sand River basin has suffered much degradation, mainly due to overgrazing.
There are some wetland zones in the basin. These areas are an important ecosystem for certain rare or endangered plants, as well as frog and bird species. There are 18 mines in the Sand River basin.

Dams and tributaries
The only relatively large dam in the Sand River basin is the Mathala Dam, also known as Houtrivier Dam, on the Hout River, a left hand tributary of the Sand.
The Diep River meets the right bank of the Sand River northeast of Polokwane town. The Mulaudzi River, also known as "Blood River", joins the Sand River from the left just north of Polokwane. The Seshego Dam is a small dam on the Mulaudzi.

See also 
Drainage basin A
 List of rivers of South Africa

References

External links
The Anglo-Boer War, 1899-1902 - The Far North-Western Front
Old & New Place Names in South Africa
Limpopo WMA1

Rivers of Limpopo
Tributaries of the Limpopo River